Zita Gurmai (born 1 June 1965 in Budapest) is a Hungarian politician who served as a Member of the European Parliament from 2004 until 2014. She is a member of the Hungarian Socialist Party, part of the Party of European Socialists.

Education and early career

1983–1988. Karl Marx University of Economics (1983–1988); doctorate 1991
1988–1990. Comporgan company, communications coordinator
1990–1992. Westel Rádiótelefon Kft., sales executive
1994–1995. Political History Institute, PR manager
1995–2002. Szelén Művelődési Tanácsadó Kft., manager

Political career
From the 1990s Gurmai was active in civil society, sets up many foundations: Nők a valódi esélyegenlőségért Alapítvány (Women's Foundation for Genuine Equality), Nők a közéletben Alapítvány (Women in Public Life Foundation). She drew up many reports on equality and done research as organiser and co-author.
2002–2004. Member of the Hungarian Parliament, delegate to the NATO Parliamentary Assembly, delegate to the Central European Network, Observer in the European Parliament
From 1993. Hungarian Socialist Party party member, in 1995. administrator, women's section
From 1999. Vice-president, Socialist International Women
From 2001. President, women's section
From 2004. President, PES Women

Member of the European Parliament, 2004–2014
During her time in the European Parliament, Gurmai served on the Committee on Constitutional Affairs (2009–2014), the Committee on Women's Rights and Gender Equality (2004–2014) and the Committee on Regional Development (2004–2009).

From 2015 until 2018, Gurmai served as Special Adviser on Gender Policy in Development Cooperation to European Commissioner for International Cooperation and Development Neven Mimica.

Member of the Hungarian Parliament, 2018–present
Since the 2018 elections, Gurmai has been a member of the Hungarian Parliament again.

In addition to her role in parliament, Gurmai has been serving as a member of the Hungarian delegation to the Parliamentary Assembly of the Council of Europe since 2018. In the Assembly, she has since been a member of the Committee on Equality and Non-Discrimination and the Committee on the Honouring of Obligations and Commitments by Member States of the Council of Europe. She has also been serving as the Assembly's General Rapporteur on violence against women since 2020.

Personal life
Gurmai was married to Mihály Gulyás. Now divorced, they have two sons, Mihály Balázs and Bálint Imre.

References

External links

 
European Parliament

1965 births
Living people
Hungarian Socialist Party politicians
Hungarian Socialist Party MEPs
MEPs for Hungary 2004–2009
MEPs for Hungary 2009–2014
Women MEPs for Hungary
Members of the National Assembly of Hungary (2002–2006)
Members of the National Assembly of Hungary (2022–2026)
Women members of the National Assembly of Hungary
Corvinus University of Budapest alumni
21st-century Hungarian politicians
Hungarian socialist feminists